Singapore competed at the 2020 Summer Paralympics in Tokyo, Japan, from 24 August to 5 September 2021. A total of 10 athletes competed in the games.

Medalist

Competitors

Archery 

Singapore has entered one archer at Women's Individual Compound Open.

Women

|-
|align=left|Nur Syahidah Alim
|align=left rowspan=1|Women's individual compound
|682
|7
|
|
|
|
|
|
|}

Athletics 

Singapore sent one male shot-putter in the games.

Men's field

Cycling 

Singapore sent one male cyclist after successfully getting a slot in the 2018 UCI Nations Ranking Allocation quota for the Asian.

Road
Men's road event

Track
Men's track event

Equestrian 

Singapore sent one athlete after being qualified. Another two athletes have qualified as well.

Powerlifting 

Singapore sent its first powerlifting representative in the game, the first time Singapore participated.

Swimming 

Three Singaporean swimmers have successfully secured a Paralympics berth after breaking the MQS.

Men

Women

See also
Singapore at the 2020 Summer Olympics

References 

Nations at the 2020 Summer Paralympics
2020
2021 in Singaporean sport